Michael Ekwoyi Apochi (born 1960 in Ichama) is a Nigerian prelate of the Catholic Church who served as bishop of the Roman Catholic Diocese of Otukpo. He was appointed bishop in 2002.

See also
Catholic Church in Nigeria
List of Catholic dioceses in Nigeria

References

Nigerian Roman Catholic bishops
1960 births
Living people
Date of birth missing (living people)